Stephen Shortridge (born October 23, 1951 in Red Oak, Iowa) is an American actor.

Shortridge appeared in more than 20 film and television projects throughout the 1970s and 1980s, most recognizably from his role as a Southern high school student named Beau De LaBarre on the television sitcom Welcome Back, Kotter. He has also done over 50 commercials for such products as Mennen, Coca-Cola, and Head & Shoulders. In 1987, he spent one year as a regular cast member on the soap opera The Bold and the Beautiful.

In the late 1980s, Shortridge quit the acting business to concentrate on painting. He presented gallery showings across the United States. He currently makes his home in Idaho with his children.  His second wife, Cathy, whom he had married in 1976, died in 2017, leaving him a widower.

Shortridge is also an author. He published his first book in 2011 titled Deepest Thanks, Deeper Apologies.

Filmography

Bibliography
Deepest Thanks, Deeper Apologies, Worthy Publishing, 2011,

References

External links

Shortridge's gallery in Idaho
Q & A with Stephen Shortridge: meet artist and author, Stephen Charles Shortridge

1951 births
Living people
20th-century American painters
20th-century American male actors
American male painters
21st-century American painters
American male television actors
People from Red Oak, Iowa
20th-century American male artists